Jacob S. Freer (January 22, 1824  in Marbletown, Ulster County, New York – January 27, 1892) was an American physician and politician from New York.

Life
He graduated from Geneva Medical College in 1846, and commenced the practice of medicine in Bloomingburg. Two years later he removed to Ellenville. He married Sarah J. Jackson (1828–1912), and they had several children.

He was a member of the New York State Assembly (Ulster Co., 1st D.) in 1852; and of the New York State Senate (10th D.) in 1862 and 1863.

He was buried at the Fantinekill Cemetery in Ellenville.

Sources
 The New York Civil List compiled by Franklin Benjamin Hough, Stephen C. Hutchins and Edgar Albert Werner (1870; pg. 443 and 474)
 Biographical Sketches of the State Officers and the Members of the Legislature of the State of New York in 1862 and '63 by William D. Murphy (1863; pg. 70ff)
 Freer genealogy at RootsWeb

External links

1824 births
1892 deaths
Democratic Party New York (state) state senators
People from Marbletown, New York
Democratic Party members of the New York State Assembly
Physicians from New York (state)
Geneva Medical College alumni
People from Ellenville, New York
People from Sullivan County, New York
19th-century American politicians